NRL refers to the National Rugby League, the top professional league of Australasian rugby league football clubs.

NRL may also refer to:

Sports leagues
NRL Racing Development Cycling Team, a California bike racing team
National Ringette League, a Canadian ringette league
National Rookie League, an American basketball minor league, 2000–2002
National Rugby League, the top professional rugby league of Australasian rugby league football clubs
National Rugby League USA, a proposed professional rugby league competition
Newcastle Rugby League, an Australian rugby league competition

Science and technology
NRL (gene), a human gene that encodes the neural retina-specific leucine zipper protein
Namespace Routing Language, a mapping from namespace URIs to schema URIs
Nucleosome Repeat Length, the average distance between the centers of neighboring nucleosomes
United States Naval Research Laboratory, a corporate research laboratory in Washington, D.C.

Other uses
National Rafidain List, used by the Assyrian Democratic Movement during the Iraqi elections
North Ronaldsay Airport, Orkney Islands, United Kingdom (IATA code)

See also 
NRL Rugby League (series), a 2003 video game franchise